The Swan 40 Frers was designed by German Frers and built by Nautor's Swan and first launched in 1992 it is the second Swan 40 model produced.

References

External links
 Nautor Swan
 German Frers Official Website

Sailing yachts
Keelboats
1990s sailboat type designs
Sailboat types built by Nautor Swan
Sailboat type designs by Germán Frers